Stade de Reims won Division 1 season 1948/1949 of the French Association Football League with 48 points.

Participating teams

 AS Cannes
 SR Colmar
 Lille OSC
 Olympique de Marseille
 FC Metz
 SO Montpellier
 FC Nancy
 OGC Nice
 RC Paris
 Stade de Reims
 Stade Rennais UC
 CO Roubaix-Tourcoing
 AS Saint-Étienne
 FC Sète
 FC Sochaux-Montbéliard
 Stade Français FC
 RC Strasbourg
 Toulouse FC

Final table

Promoted from Division 2, who will play in Division 1 season 1949/1950
 RC Lens: Champion of Division 2
 Bordeaux: Runner-up

Results

Top goalscorers

References
 Division 1 season 1948-1949 at pari-et-gagne.com

Ligue 1 seasons
French
1